K-5 is a  state highway in northeastern Kansas. Remaining completely in the Kansas City metropolitan area, it connects Leavenworth to Kansas City.

Route description
K-5 begins on Sunshine Road at US-69 just south of the US 69 Missouri River Bridge. It then merges onto Interstate 635 south, then follows Leavenworth Road west until it meets Interstate 435. K-5 merges onto northbound I-435, splitting off two exits later. After heading north on 97th Street, and turning onto Hutton Road, it then follows Wolcott Drive towards Lansing. Inside the Lansing area, it turns onto 8th Street, then onto Muncie Drive in Leavenworth. K-5 then ends at 4th Street (US-73/K-7) in Leavenworth.

K-5 mostly parallels the Missouri River for its entire run. The road's direction signs changed from west–east to north–south around 2010, although portions of it in Kansas City are still signed west–east.

In 2015, The Kansas state legislature passed Statute 68-1038, which designation the portion of K-5 between US-73/K-7 to I-435, then from I-435 to US-69, and southward on US-69 to the Oklahoma border, as the Frontier Military Scenic Byway.

History
Originally, the portion of K-5 between I-635 and US-69 in Kansas was planned to be designated as I-635.  The interstate was planned to head eastward from where it meets K-5 until it meets US-69, at which point it would turn northward and cross the Fairfax Bridge over the Missouri River. However, the plan was never carried out and the highway segment between I-635 and US-69 in the northern area of Kansas City was to be designated as K-6. In 1981, K-6 became part of K-5, when K-5 was moved off of Quindaro Boulevard.

Major intersections

References

External links

Kansas Department of Transportation State Map
KDOT: Historic State Maps

005
Transportation in Kansas City, Kansas
Transportation in the Kansas City metropolitan area
Transportation in Wyandotte County, Kansas
Transportation in Leavenworth County, Kansas